In mathematics, specifically in order theory and functional analysis, a subset  of an ordered vector space is said to be order complete in  if for every non-empty subset  of  that is order bounded in  (meaning contained in an interval, which is a set of the form  for some ), the supremum ' and the infimum  both exist and are elements of  
An ordered vector space is called order complete, Dedekind complete, a complete vector lattice, or a complete Riesz space, if it is order complete as a subset of itself,  in which case it is necessarily a vector lattice. 
An ordered vector space is said to be countably order complete if each countable subset that is bounded above has a supremum.

Being an order complete vector space is an important property that is used frequently in the theory of topological vector lattices.

Examples 

The order dual of a vector lattice is an order complete vector lattice under its canonical ordering. 

If  is a locally convex topological vector lattice then the strong dual  is an order complete locally convex topological vector lattice under its canonical order. 

Every reflexive locally convex topological vector lattice is order complete and a complete TVS.

Properties 

See also

References

Bibliography

  
  

Functional analysis